Bonita Zarrillo (born ) is a Canadian politician and is the Member of Parliament for Port Moody—Coquitlam elected in the 2021 Canadian federal election. She had previously narrowly lost the riding in 2019 to the Conservative Party's Nelly Shin. Zarrillo is a member of the New Democratic Party. Prior to her election to the House of Commons, she served as a city councillor for Coquitlam City Council.

Municipal politics
Zarrillo served three terms on the Coquitlam City Council, first elected in 2013. Zarrillo's work as a councillor focused on a diverse set of issues, including campaigns to promote anti-vaping and anti-cigarette butt causes, as well as gender equity.

As a city councillor, Zarrillo worked to bring to light issues of housing affordability and management of public works. She was critical of the proposed developments in Burquitlam, stating that the developments resembled "lifeless" developments in Eastern Canada which caused disconnects between the public and public spaces taken over by entities, highlighting concerns regarding housing affordability. On greenlighting the City Centre Area Plan (CCAP), Zarrillo expressed concerns about the displacement of low-income housing.

Zarrillo was the subject of criticism following her decision to leave a city council meeting without prior notice to attend a National Day of Action Against Anti-Asian Racism rally at Lincoln station. She stated she wanted to stand up for Coquitlam's Asian community, following a report describing the City of Vancouver as the “Anti-Asian Hate Crime Capital of North America” and a recent incident regarding the racially-motivated harassment of a Chinese-Canadian Coquitlam resident.

During the COVID-19 pandemic, Zarrillo publicly expressed her discomfort with the city council's lack of transparency during city council meetings which were held in a hybrid format. She stated that the format "[changed] the meeting dynamics and doesn't provide for equal access" and that she was "uncomfortable" with several city council members who attended the meeting in-person who were unmasked in their cubicles, raising public health concerns. Coquitlam was one of the few cities within Metro Vancouver to have in-person city council meetings during the pandemic.

Zarrillo gained a reputation as a dissenting voice during her three-term tenure as a councillor. Her work on the Coquitlam City Council resulted in a position on the board of the Federation of Canadian Municipalities.

Federal politics

2019 election
Zarrillo was nominated as the New Democratic Party's candidate to replace outgoing MP Fin Donnelly's seat, who had held the seat for a decade. Zarrillo announced her campaign for the seat on International Women's Day, and five weeks after winning a third term on the Coquitlam City Council. The final result was a three-way split between the Liberal, Conservative, and New Democratic Party. Zarrillo lost to Shin by 153 votes, falling under the 0.01% needed to trigger a judicial recount. Zarrillo filed for a recount citing concerns of "administrative mistakes", which was later terminated at Zarrillo's request. She stated that she wanted to "give confidence to the community that every vote had been counted." Zarrillo was endorsed by outgoing MP Fin Donnelly, Coquitlam-Maillardville MLA Selina Robinson, Kwikwetlem First Nation Chief Ed Hall, the New Westminster and District Labour Council, and Unifor Local 2000. As she was a sitting city councillor, she returned to her work following her loss.

2021 election
Zarrillo ran again in the 2021 election in a rematch against Shin. The Port Moody-Coquitlam riding was targeted by the three major parties due to its close 2019 result, and New Democratic Party leader Jagmeet Singh visited the riding twice during his national campaign tour. Zarrillo's campaign for election was endorsed by Coquitlam-Burke Mountain MLA Fin Donnelly, Amy Lubik of Port Moody City Council, Chris Wilson of the Coquitlam City Council, and Chief Ed Hall of the Kwikwetlem First Nation.

Zarrillo won in her rematch against Shin, with 62.2 percent of voter turnout in the riding, flipping the seat back to the New Democratic Party. Zarrillo was confirmed to have been elected four days following the election, after mail-in ballots had been counted. She resigned from her city council seat on October 1, 2021. Coquitlam City Council subsequently unanimously voted to file a request to the Minister of Municipal Affairs Josie Osborne to not hold a mandated byelection for her seat, citing concerns as a result of the COVID-19 pandemic, and that the replacement would only serve less than eight months on council.

Policy positions
Zarrillo was known for her work on Coquitlam City Council as an advocate for green jobs and affordable housing. She also focused on investment in transportation infrastructure. During an election debate, Zarrillo stated that municipalities were "desperate" for stable federal funding in regards to transit infrastructure. She criticized the Coquitlam City Council's lack of action in regards to funding transit. Zarrillo praised outgoing MP Fin Donnelly's work in regards to implementing Canada's ban on shark finning and closed containment aquaculture.

Climate
Zarrillo opposes the Trans Mountain pipeline expansion project, stating the need for urgent climate action. Zarrillo highlighted the importance of transitioning away from fossil fuels, and her view that the city of Coquitlam did not need a secondary pipeline running through the city to deliver an additional 900,000 barrels of oil. Zarrillo stated the proposed expansion was "unreasonable and unrealistic based on what the future needs to look like.” As a member of Coquitlam's City Council, she put forth a motion for the city of Coquitlam to apply, joining the neighboring city of Port Moody, to be an intervenor during the National Energy Board hearings regarding the issue. The motion was subsequently unanimously endorsed by the City Council.

Housing
Zarrillo's work as a councillor focused on the issues of housing affordability. Zarrillo stated that of the available housing inventory, too much was going towards luxury homebuyers, highlighting the plan for half a million units of affordable housing offered by the NDP. To alleviate the housing crisis, Zarrillo proposed the construction of purpose-built housing, either through housing cooperatives, or exemptions on the GST to housing developers and potential renovators. She discussed displacement of homeowners as a direct result of a lack of housing affordability and as a visible result of the housing crisis within the local community.

Personal life
Zarrillo was born in Saskatoon and graduated from the University of Manitoba with a degree in sociology. Zarrillo travelled around Canada, living in nearly every province and overseas following her graduation, working as a computer programmer. She later worked as a data analyst to map consumer behaviour for companies such as Walmart. At the age of 48, Zarrillo quit her position as a business analyst after she was diagnosed with breast cancer in order to focus on her treatment and recovery. She moved back to Coquitlam in 2010, and started a business as a jobs recruiter.

Four generations of Zarrillo's family reside within Coquitlam. Zarrillo is a mother of three children.

Electoral history

Federal

Municipal

2018 Coquitlam City Council election
Top 8 candidates elected

2014 Coquitlam City Council election
Top 8 candidates elected

References

External links

Living people
Coquitlam city councillors
Members of the House of Commons of Canada from British Columbia
New Democratic Party MPs
Politicians from Saskatoon
Women members of the House of Commons of Canada
Women municipal councillors in Canada
21st-century Canadian politicians
21st-century Canadian women politicians
Year of birth missing (living people)